Railway truck may refer to:
 A covered goods wagon, British and Commonwealth usage
 A truck, US and Canadian usage